Wolfgang Reinhardt (6 May 1943 – 11 June 2011) was a West German pole vaulter. Competing for the United Team of Germany he won a silver medal at the 1964 Olympics and was awarded the Silbernes Lorbeerblatt for this achievement. Domestically he held the West German outdoor (1963–65), and indoors titles (1963 and 1968). He was trained as an engraver, but later in 1961 enrolled to the German Sport University Cologne to study sports. Reinhardt was married to Ortrud Mentges. His brother Hartmut was also a competitive pole vaulter.

References

External links

Leverkusen who's who 
Mention of Wolfgang Reinhardt's death 

1943 births
2011 deaths
German male pole vaulters
West German pole vaulters
People from Göppingen
Sportspeople from Stuttgart (region)
Olympic silver medalists for the United Team of Germany
Athletes (track and field) at the 1964 Summer Olympics
Olympic athletes of the United Team of Germany
Medalists at the 1964 Summer Olympics
Olympic silver medalists in athletics (track and field)